Rakesh Sharma (11 October 1955) is an Indian civil servant and politician who has served as Chief Secretary of Government of Uttarakhand. Sharma is a 1981 batch Uttar Pradesh/Uttarakhand (Since 2001) cadre Indian Administrative Service officer. An enigmatic leader and effective administrator, he has overseen development projects at bot

Early life and education 

Sharma was born on 11 October 1955 in New Delhi. He went to primary, middle and high school in New Delhi. He undertook the CBSE curriculum from 1970 to 1972. He was the topper of his high school and the merit position holder in the CBSE examinations in the year 1972 in the Humanities Group.

Sharma completed his graduation from Sri Ram College of Commerce, Delhi University, New Delhi (1972–1975). He obtained 1st division in his BA (Honors) Economics degree. While at SRCC, he was the recipient of Academic Prizes for each year during 1972–1975. He completed his postgraduate studies between 1976–1977 and received a Master of Arts degree in Economics from Delhi School of Economics where he again went on to obtain 1st division.

Subsequently, he became a lecturer at Shri Ram College of Commerce (SRCC) and took postgraduate classes at South Campus, Delhi University. In 1996, he received a Master of Science degree from London School of Economics where he specialized in Economics of Less Developed Countries and Labour Economics.

Sharma joined the Indian Railways in 1980 and went on to join the Indian Administrative Service in 1981. He commenced his training at Lal Bahadur Shastri National Academy Of Administration in Mussoorie from 1981 to 1983 where he underwent training in various foundation and professional programs.

Career in Government 

 1983–1985 - SDM- Saharanpur/Rorkee
 1985–1987 - Chief Development Officer, Agra
 1987–1990 - General Manager, UP Export Corporation, Kanpur
 1900–1991 - DM- Sajahanpur
 1991–1993 - DM- Pithodagadh
 1993–1995 - Additional Chief Executive, Noida
 1995-1996 - MSc. At LSE
 1996–2000 - Additional Director, UP Academy of Administration, Nainital; Vice Chairman, center for development studies UPAA, Nainital
 2000–2001 - Secretary- Home, Personnel, Estates. Actively participated in setting up of infrastructure of newly carved out state at Dehradun. 
 2001–2007 - Commissioner, Kumaon and Director, Uttarakhand Academy of Administration; Chairman, Centre for development studies (UAA), Nainital; Chairman, Lake development authority, Nainital
 2007–2009 - Secretary, Sport & Youth Welfare, Dehradun, Government Of Uttarakhand
 2009–2011 - Secretary, Tourism and Culture, Sports and Youth Welfare, Dehradun, Government Of Uttarakhand 
 2011–2013 - Principal Secretary, Technical Education, Dehradun, Government Of Uttarakhand
 2013–2016 - Chief Secretary; Chief Resident Commissioner, Government Of Uttarakhand in Delhi; Chief Investment Commissioner, Uttarakhand
 2014–2016 - Chairman, Board of Rvenue, Uttarakhand, Dehradun

References 

1955 births
Living people
Indian Administrative Service officers
Uttarakhand cadre civil servants